Nicksville is a populated place in Cochise County, Arizona, just north of the international border between the United States and Mexico.

Transportation
Cochise Connection provides bus connections between Douglas, Bisbee, and Sierra Vista, with a stop in Nicksville.

References

Populated places in Cochise County, Arizona